The white-tip catshark (Parmaturus albimarginatus) is a recently described, deepwater catshark, known only from a single specimen collected from northern New Caledonia, at a depth of 590–732 m. The only known specimen, an adult male, measured a total of 57.7 cm in length. These sharks have spiracles, which are respiratory openings behind the eyes. Catsharks, all in all, are likewise recognized by two little dorsal fins. Curiously enough, numerous individuals from this group of sharks are likewise called dogfish.

References 

white-tip catshark
Fish of New Caledonia
white-tip catshark